Maroondan is a rural locality in the Bundaberg Region, Queensland, Australia. In the  Maroondan had a population of 346 people.

History 
The locality takes its name from the Maroondan railway station. Maroondah is an Aboriginal word in the Waka language meaning sand goanna.

The first Maroondan State School opened on 1909 and was renamed Uping State School circa 1927.  It closed circa 1934.

The second Maroondan State School opened on 25 August 1927. This school may have been originally known as Maroondah Station State School.

In the  Maroondan had a population of 346 people.

Education 
Maroondan State School is a government primary (Prep-6) school for boys and girls at 31 Duke Stehbens Road. In 2018, the school had an enrolment of 41 students with 3 teachers (2 full-time equivalent) and 7 non-teaching staff (3 full-time equivalent).

There is no secondary school in Maroondah. The nearest secondary school is Gin Gin State High School in neighbouring Gin Gin to the west.

References 

Bundaberg Region
Localities in Queensland